Bronwyn Turei is a New Zealand actress and singer. She played Cordelia "Cody" Latimer in the New Zealand television comedy/drama series Go Girls (2009).

Early life
Born in Gisborne, New Zealand, she attended Gisborne Girls' High School and was Head Prefect in 2001. She moved to Auckland to attend the Unitec School of Performing Arts. Turei is of Ngāti Porou tribal ancestry, through her father.

Turei made her stage debut at the age of nine when she played a workhouse boy in a local production of Oliver Twist. At high school in Gisborne, she had distinctive achievements in oratory, music, drama and korero Māori. She was one of 18 students chosen from an applicant pool of 160 to attend Unitec School of Performing Arts, that same year travelling to London to study at The Globe with the New Zealand Young Shakespeare Company.

Turei released an album, Empty Room in 2006, available for preview on Myspace.

She currently resides in Auckland, New Zealand.

Filmography

Television

Film

Awards

References

External links

Living people
1984 births
New Zealand actresses
New Zealand television actresses
New Zealand Māori actresses
People from Gisborne, New Zealand
Unitec Institute of Technology alumni
People educated at Gisborne Girls' High School